The 1974–75 National Football League was the 44th staging of the National Football League (NFL), an annual Gaelic football tournament for the Gaelic Athletic Association county teams of Ireland.

Meath won a surprise victory over Dublin in the final.

Format

Divisions
 Division One: 12 teams. Split into two groups of 6.
 Division Two: 6 teams
 Division Three: 14 teams. Split into two groups of 7.

Round-robin format
Each team played every other team in its division (or group where the division is split) once, either home or away.

Points awarded
2 points were awarded for a win and 1 for a draw.

Titles
Teams in all three divisions competed for the National Football League title.

Knockout stage qualifiers
 Division One (A): top 2 teams
 Division One (B): top 2 teams
 Division Two: group winners
 Division Three: Division winners. Determined by a play-off between the two group winners

Knockout phase structure
In the quarter-finals, the match-ups were as follows:
 Quarter-final 1: Second-placed team in Division One (A) v First-placed team in Division Two 
 Quarter-final 2: Second-placed team in Division One (B) v First-placed team in Division Three 
The semi-final match-ups are:
 Semi-final 1: First Placed team in Division One (A) v Winner Quarter-final 1
 Semi-final 2: First Placed team in Division One (B) v Winner Quarter-final 2

The final match-up is: Winner Semi-final 1 v Winner Semi-final 2.

Promotion and relegation

 Division One: 1 relegation place. Bottom teams in Division One (A) and Division One (B) play-off
 Division Two: group winners promoted to Division One. Bottom team demoted to Division Three.
 Division Three: 1 promotion place. Group winners of Division Three (A) and Division Three (B) play-off

Separation of teams on equal points

In the event that teams finish on equal points, then teams were separated according to points average(goals scored divided by goals conceded).

Group stage

Division One

Results

Division One relegation play-off

Tables

Group A

Group B

Division Two

Table

Division Three

Results

Division Three promotion play-off

Tables

Group A

Group B

Knockout stage

Quarter-finals

Semi-finals

Finals

References

National Football League
National Football League
National Football League (Ireland) seasons